"The Zanti Misfits" is an episode of the original The Outer Limits television show. It was first broadcast on December 30, 1963, during the first season. In 1997, the TV Guide ranked this episode number 98 on its "100 Greatest Episodes of All Time" list of all US television.

Introduction 
An alien world demands that Earth provide a penal colony for its criminals. The criminals are grotesque, rat-sized, ant-like insectoids with almost human faces.

Opening narration

Plotline
Military forces have cordoned off a ghost town, aptly named Morgue, located in a remote section in the deserts of California while awaiting the arrival of a spacecraft from the planet Zanti. The perfectionist rulers of that planet, after making radio contact with our government, have decided that the Earth is the "perfect place" to exile their undesirables and criminals in exchange for sharing technological advances with Earth. They threaten total destruction if their penal ship is attacked, or if their privacy is not maintained. During the negotiations, Ben Garth, a bank robber on the run, along with his reluctant, morally deficient accomplice/girlfriend, Lisa, cross the cordon, and run down an armed sentry during the approach of the Zanti ship. After seeing the ship land, Ben climbs a small mesa to investigate the landing site. A Zanti regent emerges from an open hatch of the ship and kills Garth.  The Zanti are revealed to be grotesque oversized ant-like beings with malicious human-like faces.  The Zanti regent pursues Ben's now-terrified accomplice. Believing that their privacy was violated, the remaining Zanti prisoners commandeer the penal ship and land it atop the roof of the military command post. When the Zanti prisoners attack Earth's nervous soldiers, a brutal firefight ensues, and all of the aliens are massacred. The soldiers and airmen anxiously await the expected reprisal, but, instead, they receive a message of thanks from the Zanti leaders who explain that they were incapable of executing members of their own species so they sent them into the hands of a race who possessed no qualms about killing — the human race, referring to us as "practiced executioners".

Closing narration

Special effects

Jim Danforth provided the stop-motion effects of the Zantis for this episode.

During the Zantis' initial attack after landing on the roof of the command post, the creatures are seen descending an exterior wall; however, with the technology of the time, the stop-motion effect was not able to be used during this scene.  Here, the Zantis are mere models being lowered on wires, their movements erratic, with their legs not moving.

Contemporary usage
"Zantis" and "Zanti Misfits" have been used to describe certain patterns of extremely high-frequency stock trading.

In popular culture
The 1986 horror film Critters featured an interstellar prison warden named Zanti, presumably an homage to this episode, in which the concept of an alien prison is pivotal.

In 1983 The Turtles released an EP titled The Rhythm Butchers Vs. The Zanti Misfits.

Frank Zappa has released a piece titled Zanti Serenade on the 1992 album Playground Psychotics.

Cast

References

External links
 

The Outer Limits (1963 TV series season 1) episodes
1963 American television episodes
Television episodes written by Joseph Stefano
Television episodes about alien visitations